The Camunian rose (Italian: Rosa camuna, Lombard: Rœsa camuna) is the name given to a particular symbol represented among the rock carvings of Camonica Valley (Brescia, Italy). It consists of a meandering closed line that winds around nine cup marks. It can be symmetrical, asymmetrical or form a swastika.

Meaning and variations
There are many theories about its meaning, Emmanuel Anati suggests that it might symbolize a complex religious concept, perhaps a solar symbol linked to the astral movement. In Val Camonica this motif dates back to the Iron Age, particularly from the 7th to 1st centuries BC. There is only one doubtful case datable at the Final Bronze Age (1,100 BC). These figures are placed mainly in the Middle Camonica Valley (Capo di Ponte, Foppe of Nadro, Sellero, Ceto and Paspardo), but numerous cases are in the Low Valley too (Darfo Boario Terme and Esine).

The motif has been deeply studied by Paola Farina, who created a corpus of all the "camunian roses" known in Val Camonica: she counted 84 "roses" engraved on 27 rocks. Three basic types have been determined:
 swastika type: the 9 cup-marks make a 5 by 5 cross; the contour forms four arms that bend about 90° and every arm includes one of the top cup-marks of the cross. There are 16 “roses” of this type;
 asymmetric-swastika type: the disposition of the 9 cup-marks is the same as the previous; but the contour is different, because only two arms bend 90°, while the other ones join together in a single bilobate arm. There are 12 “roses” of this type;
 quadrilobate type: the 9 cup-marks are aligned in three columns of three cups; the contour develops into four orthogonal and symmetric arms, and everyone includes a cup-mark. It is the more widespread type of “camunian rose”, there are 56 examples.

Regarding the interpretation, not easy for a symbol pertaining to a lost and past culture, Paola Farina suggests that the "Camunian rose" had originally a solar meaning, which then developed into a wider meaning of a positive power, to bring life and good luck.

The symbol is called in Italian "rosa camuna" (camunian rose) because it looks like a flower, but this name is a modern invention. A stylized "camunian rose" has become the symbol of the Lombardy Region.

See also
 Camunni
 Rock Drawings in Valcamonica
 Looped square
 Swastika Stone
 Western use of the swastika in the early 20th century

References

Bibliography
 
 Farina, Paola (1998). La “rosa camuna” nell’arte rupestre della Valcamonica, NAB, 6, pp. 185–205.

External links

 
 

Symbols
Rock art in Europe
Swastika